Alpaca fleece is the natural fiber harvested from an alpaca. There are two different types of alpaca fleece. The most common fleece type comes from a Huacaya. Huacaya fiber grows and looks similar to sheep wool in that the animal looks "fluffy". The second type of alpaca is Suri and makes up less than 10% of the South American alpaca population. Suri fiber is more similar to natural silk and hangs off the body in locks that have a dreadlock appearance.  While both fibers can be used in the worsted milling process using light weight yarn or thread,  Huacaya fiber can also be used in a woolen process and spun into various weight yarns. It is a soft, durable, luxurious and silky natural fiber.

While huacaya fiber is similar to sheep's wool, it is warmer, not prickly, and has no lanolin, which makes it hypoallergenic. Alpaca fiber is naturally water-repellent and fire resistant. Huacaya, an alpaca that grows soft spongy fiber, has natural crimp, thus making a naturally elastic yarn well-suited for knitting. Suri has no crimp and thus is a better fit for woven goods. The designer Armani has used Suri alpaca to fashion men's and women's suits. In the United States, groups of smaller alpaca breeders have banded together to create "fiber co-ops," to make the manufacture of alpaca fiber products less expensive.

The preparing, carding, spinning, weaving and finishing process of alpaca is very similar to the process used for wool.

Alpacas

Types

There are two types of alpaca: Huacaya (which produce a dense, soft, crimpy sheep-like fiber), and the Suri (with silky pencil-like locks, resembling dreadlocks but without matted fibers). Suris, prized for their longer and silkier fibers, are estimated to make up 19–20% of the North American alpaca population. Since its import into the United States, the number of Suri alpacas has grown substantially and become more color diverse. The Suri is thought to be rarer, most likely because the breed was reserved for royalty during Incan times.  Suris are often said to be less cold hardy than Huacaya, but both breeds are successfully raised in more extreme climates. They were developed in South America.

History
Alpacas have been bred in Pre-Columbian South America for over 5,000 years. They were domesticated from the vicuñas by the ancient tribes of the Andean highlands of Ecuador, Peru, Chile, Bolivia and Northwest of Argentina. According to archaeological studies alpaca fiber was similar in quality to the wild vicuña prior to the  Spanish Conquests in the 1500s. 2,000–year-old Paracas textiles are thought to include alpaca fiber. Also known as "The Fiber of the gods", Alpaca was used to make clothing for royalty. In recent years, alpacas have also been exported to other countries. In countries such as the US, Australia and New Zealand, breeders shear their animals annually, weigh the fleeces and test them for fineness. With the resulting knowledge, they are able to breed heavier-fleeced animals with finer fiber. Fleece weights vary, with the top stud males reaching annual shear weights up to  total fleece and  good quality fleece. The discrepancy in weight is because an alpaca has guard hair, which is often removed before spinning.

Alpaca fiber

Production 
Alpacas are shorn once a year in spring. After shearing, the fleece is roughly cleaned and sorted according to color. The dried wool is then carded; in this process, the loose alpaca fibers are aligned into a strain of Alpaca fleece with a carding machine's help.

Like sheep, alpacas have thicker awn hairs.  These long straight hairs located between the undercoat ensure that the fine coat does not become matted. Therefore alpacas should not be brushed; this would destroy their undercoat structure. The awn hairs are much coarser than the fine undercoat, and can be carded easily, but they can also be sorted out. The final result from this sorting process is called baby alpaca.

After carding, the strains are ready to be spun into yarn with a spinning wheel. Finally, the wool should be washed to remove impurities.  Alpaca wool contains almost no wool grease (lanolin), making it easy to clean. The wool is then ready for sale as knitting wool or for further processing.

History of the Alpaca fiber industry 

The Amerindians of Peru used this fiber in the manufacture of many styles of fabrics for thousands of years before its introduction into Europe as a commercial product. The alpaca was a crucial component of ancient life in the Andes, as it provided not only warm clothing, but also meat.

Incan culture involved the alpaca, as well as llamas and guanacos, in ritual sacrifice. Methods of killing the beasts varied based on the god receiving the sacrifice, the festival during which it took place, and even the color of the animal's fur. One method involved slitting open the animal's left side and reaching inside the chest cavity to remove the heart.

The first European importations of alpaca fiber were into Spain. Spain transferred that fiber to Germany and France. Apparently, alpaca yarn was spun in England for the first time about the year 1808, but the fiber was condemned as an unworkable material. In 1830, Benjamin Outram, of Greetland, near Halifax, appears to have reattempted spinning it, and again it was condemned. These two attempts failed due to the style of fabric into which the yarn was woven—a type of camlet. With the introduction of cotton warps into Bradford trade about 1836, the true qualities of alpaca could be assessed as it was developed into fabric. It is not known where the cotton warp and mohair or alpaca weft plain-cloth came from, but it was this structure which enabled Titus Salt, then a young Bradford manufacturer, to use alpaca successfully. The typical "alpaca fabric" is a very characteristic "dress fabric."

Due to the successful manufacture of various alpaca cloths by Sir Titus Salt and other Bradford manufacturers, a great demand for alpaca wool arose, which could not be met by the native product. Apparently, the number of alpacas available never increased appreciably. Unsuccessful attempts were made to acclimatize alpaca in England, on the European continent and in Australia, and even to cross English breeds of sheep with alpaca. There is a cross between alpaca and llama—a true hybrid in every sense—producing a material placed upon the Liverpool market under the name "Huarizo". Crosses between the alpaca and vicuña have not proved satisfactory, as the crosses that have produced offspring have a very short fleece, more characteristic of the vicuña.  Current attempts to cross these two breeds are underway at farms in the US. Alpacas are now being bred in the US, Canada, Australia, New Zealand, UK, Germany and numerous other places.

In recent years, interest in alpaca fiber clothing has surged, perhaps partly because alpaca ranching has a reasonably low impact on the environment. Individual U.S. farms are producing finished alpaca products like hats, mitts, scarves, socks, insoles, footwarmers, sweaters, jackets, as well as almost any other product. Outdoor sports enthusiasts claim that its lighter weight and better warmth provides them more comfort in colder weather. Using an alpaca and wool blend such as merino is common to the alpaca fiber industry to reduce price, however no additional materials need to be added to improve processing or the qualities of the final product. Alpaca improves any other textile it is blended with, however 100% alpaca garments can be made without the addition of other materials, which creates a long lasting and very luxurious product.

In December 2006, the General Assembly of the United Nations proclaimed 2009 to be the International Year of Natural Fibres, so as to raise the profile of alpaca and other natural fibers.

Fiber structure
Alpaca fiber is similar in structure to sheep wool fiber. The fiber softness comes from having a different smoother scale surface than sheep wool. American breeders have enhanced the softness by selecting for finer fiber diameter fiber, similar to merino wool. Fiber diameter is a highly inherited trait in both alpaca and sheep. The difference in the individual fiber scales compared to sheep wool also creates the glossy shine which is prized in alpaca. Alpaca fibers have a higher tensile strength than wool fibers. In processing, slivers lack fiber cohesion and single alpaca rovings lack strength. Blend these together and the durability is increased several times over. More twisting is necessary, especially in Suri, and this can reduce a yarn's softness.

The alpaca has a very fine and light fleece. It does not retain water, is a thermal insulator even when wet and can resist solar radiation effectively. These characteristics guarantee the animals a permanent and appropriate coat to protect against extreme changes of temperature. This fiber offers the same protection to humans.

Medullation 
Medullated fibers are fibers with a central core, which may be continuous, interrupted, or fragmented.  Here, the cortical cells that make up the walls of the fiber are wrapped around a medulla, or core, that is made up of another type of cell (called medullary cells). Later, these 
cells may contract or disappear, forming air pockets which assist insulation.

Medullation can be an objectionable trait. Medullated fibers can take less dye, standing out in the finished garment, and are weaker. The proportion of medullated fibers is higher in the coarser, unwanted guard hairs: there is less or no medullation in the finer, lower micrometer fibers. These undesirable fibers are easy to see and give a garment a hairy appearance. Quality alpaca products should be free from these medullated fibers.

Quality

Good quality alpaca fiber is approximately 18 to 25 μm in diameter. While breeders report fiber can sell for US$2 to $4 per ounce, the world wholesale price for processed, spun alpaca "tops" is only between about $10 to $24/kg (according to quality), i.e. about $0.28 to $0.68 per oz. Finer fleeces, ones with a smaller diameter, are preferred, and thus are more expensive. This is sometimes caused by overfeeding; as excess nutrients are converted to (thicker) fiber rather than to fat. 

Elite alpaca breeders in the United States are attempting to breed animals with fleece that does not degrade in quality as the animals age. They are looking for lingering fineness (fiber diameters remaining under 20 μm) for aging animals. It is believed this lingering fineness is heritable and thus can be improved over time.

As with all fleece-producing animals, quality varies from animal to animal, and some alpacas produce fiber which is less than ideal. Fiber and conformation are the two most important factors in determining an alpaca's value.

Alpacas come in 22 natural colors, with more than 300 shades from a true black through brown-blacks, browns, fawns, white, silver-greys, and rose-greys. There are even more colors. However, white is predominant, because of selective breeding: the white fiber can be dyed in the largest ranges of colors. In South America, the preference is for white, as they generally have better fleece than the darker-colored animals. The demand for darker fiber have sprung up in the United States and elsewhere, though, to reintroduce the colors, but the quality of the darker fiber has decreased slightly. Breeders have been diligently working on breeding dark animals with exceptional fiber, and much progress has been made over the last few years.

Dyeing
Before dyeing, the alpaca fiber must go through other stages:

 Selection of wool, according to color, size and quality of fiber
 "Escarminado", removal of grass, dirt, thorns, and other impurities
 Washing, to remove dirt - alpaca contains no grease or lanolin found in wool which requires harsh chemical scouring. 
 Spinning

Once the fiber is clean, it is possible to begin the process of dyeing. Alpaca dyes beautifully with synthetic or natural dyes.

To dye 1 kg of alpaca wool with cochinilla (natural RED dye), 
Boil 5 liters of water in an aluminum can with 100 g of cochinilla for an hour.
Sift and put the fiber in the water.
Boil again for an hour and add 50 lemons cut in halves.
Then take out the wool and hang for drying.
Note: For dyeing with another natural dye (native plants), add 2 kg of the products to the water and boil.

Uses

Alpaca fiber is used for many purposes, including making clothing such as bedding, hats, mitts, socks, scarves, gloves, and jumpers. Rugs and toys can also be made from alpaca fiber. Sweaters are most common.

See also
International Year of Natural Fibres

References

External links

 Preparing your Alpaca for showing
 Why Alpaca is Great for Snowmobiling
  PDF  with information on the history, care, and knitting practicalities dealing with alpaca fiber. Published by Interweave Press.
 How to Care For Your Alpaca Garments Published by Diverall.

Wool
Indigenous textile art of the Americas
Alpacas